Kenas Aroi (17 April 1942 – 22 January 1991) was a Nauruan political figure. He was President of the Republic of Nauru from 17 August to 12 December 1989.

Background 

Aroi was a member of the Parliament of Nauru, Speaker of the Parliament of Nauru from January 1971 to January 1977. He was elevated to cabinet in January 1977. He was Minister of Finance under Bernard Dowiyogo in January 1978. 

Aroi was also Minister of Finance under Hammer DeRoburt from April 1979 to September 1986 and from October 1986 to December 1986. Before he became president, Aroi was involved in the Nauru Phosphate Corporation.

President of Nauru

With support from Kennan Adeang, as Hammer DeRoburt was caught in a military situation, Aroi became president on 17 August 1989. Adeang then became finance minister. During his period of Presidential office Aroi experienced health problems and after a stroke in November 1989 he did not run in the elections in December of that year. He was succeeded on 12 December 1989 by Bernard Dowiyogo.

Personal

Kenas Aroi was a member of the Eamwitmwit tribe. Aroi died on 22 January 1991. His widow, Millicent Aroi, is Nauru's High Commissioner to Fiji and a composer.

See also
 Politics in Nauru

References

Speakers of the Parliament of Nauru
Members of the Parliament of Nauru
1942 births
1991 deaths
Presidents of Nauru
Finance Ministers of Nauru
People from Boe District
20th-century Nauruan politicians